Birdwell is a village in the Metropolitan Borough of Barnsley in South Yorkshire, England and is located approximately  south of Barnsley,  north-east of Sheffield, and  west of Doncaster. The village falls within the Rockingham Ward of the Barnsley Metropolitan Council.  Neighbouring villages include Worsbrough, Tankersley and Hoyland Common.

The A61 (Sheffield Road) passes north–south through the length of Birdwell, and at the southern end is Birdwell Roundabout which is the junction between the M1 motorway at Junction 36 and the A61. The roundabout also marks the start of the Dearne Valley Parkway, a relatively new dual carriageway which links the M1 at Junction 36 to the A1 at Marr (near Doncaster).

Birdwell is run under the auspices of Barnsley Metropolitan Borough Council.

History 
The origins of the village of Birdwell date back to the time of the English Civil War, around 1642, when the village name is first mentioned.

In the years following the Second World War, open cast mining took place on much of the land to the northern end of Birdwell, and in some areas the remains of the quarries can still be found. Much of the land was subsequently restored to agriculture, mainly pasture with a little low key arable production and since the 1970s was owned by a local farming company. A small pocket of woodland called Parkinson Spring survived the mining activity and whilst little is known of its history, the name 'spring' could infer it was coppiced for the production of spring wood. The predominantly ancient woodlands of Miller Hill and Wigfield Wood are thought to be remnants of the once extensive woodland of the Wortley Park estate, an area through which the M1 motorway was subsequently built.

Hangmanstone Depot was the site of Allan Finlay's diesel engine export company Hartwood Exports, where a great number of UK buses and other commercial vehicles ended their lives.

Birdwell & Hoyland Common railway station, was a railway station on the South Yorkshire Railway's Blackburn Valley Line between Westwood and High Royds. The station was intended to serve Birdwell, Pilley and Hoyland Common, although the original chosen site was moved half a mile nearer towards Barnsley to serve the purposes of the Earl of Wharncliffe who was, at that time, sinking Wharncliffe Silkstone Colliery nearby. This move away made the station less convenient for most of the population. The station was opened in February 1855, the building having an ornate canopy over its entrance and containing a private waiting room for use by the Earl of Wharncliffe. The station was closed on 7 December 1953.

Landmarks 
 Birdwell Club is a former working men's club located on Sheffield Road. In 2005 it played host to a highly rated gig by local band the Arctic Monkeys, which was voted 9th best gig of the year by the Observer Music Monthly, notably surpassing Live8. 
 The Take 2 centre at the south end of Birdwell houses the Academy Theatre - a full theatre facility with a varied programme of live entertainment, licensed bar and a bistro
 Birdwell Lodge Craft and Antique Centre
 Worsbrough Mill Museum and Country Park
 Travellers Inn
 Cock Inn public house
The Obelisk. Towards the southern end of Birdwell stands a large obelisk which was constructed in 1775 (according to the plaque) to mark the distance (3 miles) to Wentworth Castle (at nearby Stainborough) built by William Wentworth, 2nd Earl of Strafford (1722–1791). The obelisk was struck by lightning on 6 June 1906.

Education 
Birdwell has its own primary school and private day-nursery called Chatterbox.

Sport
Two football teams from the village have played in the FA Cup: Birdwell F.C. and Birdwell Primitive Methodists F.C.

Birdwell played in 11 FA Cup competitions between 1907 and 1928 whereas Birdwell Primitive Methodists played in just the one FA Cup competition, losing their one and only FA Cup game. The game on 11 September 1909 was against Atlas and Norfolk Works. The Sheffield side had originally been drawn at home but the game was played at Birdwell. The 'Primitives', as they were often known, took the lead and were level with the visitors at half-time but the latter proved too strong and ran out 4-1 winners, Nuttall scoring all four goals.

Notable people
The Wednesday and England footballer, Harry Ruddlesdin was born in Birdwell in 1876 and started his football career with Birdwell F.C.
Charlie Williams (OBE) lived in Birdwell until his death, in September 2006.
Keith Matthewman was born here in 1936.
Nick Crowe artist was born in Birdwell in 1968.
Sylvia Young (founder and Principal of the famous Sylvia Young Theatre School in London) lived in Birdwell as a child evacuee from the capital during the Second World War.
Andrew Raynes  World Strongman Competitor.

See also
Listed buildings in Rockingham

References

External links 

 Barnsley MBC
 Birdwell Woods (the Woodland trust)
 Birdwell community forum
 Birdwell Methodist church
 Birdwell Primary School

Villages in South Yorkshire
Geography of the Metropolitan Borough of Barnsley